Mbungu is a Kikongo surname and given name. Notable people with the surname include:
Mbungu Ekofa (born 1948), Congolese footballer
Serge Mputu Mbungu (born 1980), Congolese footballer
Taty Mbungu, Congolese footballer

Kongo-language surnames
African given names